Snowdonia is the fourth studio album by American indie rock band Surfer Blood, released on February 3, 2017, on Joyful Noise. It was the band's first album since the death of guitarist Thomas Fekete and the departure of bass guitarist Kevin Williams. The album features artwork from sculptor Devra Freelander.

Track listing

Personnel 
 John Paul Pitts - vocals, guitar, mixing, producer
 Tyler Schwarz - drums
 Mike McCleary - guitar
 Lindsey Mills - bass
 Surfer Blood - producers
 Fred Freeman - engineer
 Brian Rosemeyer - engineer
 Pete Lyman - mastering
 Rob Schnapf - mixing
 Devra Freelander - artwork
 David Woodruff - layout

References 

2017 albums
Surfer Blood albums
Joyful Noise Recordings albums